Martin Rýgl (born 14 May 1986, in Jablonec nad Nisou) is a Czech professional ice hockey defenceman who currently plays with HC Bílí Tygři Liberec in the Czech Extraliga.

Rýgl previously played for HC Dukla Jihlava, HC Berounští Medvědi, BK Mladá Boleslav, HC Znojemští Orli, HC Olomouc and HC Benátky nad Jizerou.

References

External links
 

Czech ice hockey defencemen
HC Bílí Tygři Liberec players
Living people
1986 births
Sportspeople from Jablonec nad Nisou
BK Mladá Boleslav players
HK Dukla Trenčín players
HK Nitra players
Piráti Chomutov players
HC Benátky nad Jizerou players
Orli Znojmo players
HC Karlovy Vary players
Czech expatriate ice hockey players in Slovakia